Augustus Hewitt-Fox (7 March 1884 – 2 May 1959) was a South African cricketer. He played in twenty-four first-class matchesbetween 1905/06 and 1929/30.

See also
 List of Eastern Province representative cricketers

References

External links
 

1884 births
1959 deaths
South African cricketers
Eastern Province cricketers
Free State cricketers
Cricketers from Cape Town